Anti-Korean sentiment or Koryophobia involves hatred or dislike that is directed towards Korean people, culture or either of the two states (North Korea or South Korea) on the Korean Peninsula.

Origins
Anti-Korean sentiment is present in China, Japan, and within both Koreas, and stems from such issues as nationalism, politics, economic competition, cultural influences, and historical disputes. Anti-North Korean sentiment may be the strongest in Japan, South Korea, and the United States.

History
In China, it has only come to prominence recently, due to issues such as the 2008 Summer Olympics torch relay; which have accumulated along with other issues over the years.

In Japan, modern dislike of North and South Korea can be seen as a form of political and historical issues; these issues are heightened by the North Korean abductions of Japanese citizens and the Liancourt Rocks dispute, respectively.

Within Korea, distrust between the two states have existed ever since the end of the Korean War; with the earliest accounts dating from the Korean DMZ Conflict in the 1960s.

Region-based sentiment

China

Korea and China have historically maintained complicated ties. When Korea was annexed by Imperial Japan in 1910, it fell under Japanese influence. In China it is believed that some ethnic Koreans served in the Imperial Japanese Army whose invasion of China launched the Second Sino-Japanese War in July 1937. Adding to this sentiment is the allegation that some Koreans reportedly operated the Burma-Siam Death Railway. The Chinese referred to Koreans as Er guizi.

At the end of World War II, North Korea, which was aligned with the Soviet bloc, became an ally of the People's Republic of China, while the PRC and the Republic of Korea did not recognize each other. During the Korean War, when China was engaged in war with South Korea and its United Nations allies, propaganda was used to indoctrinate people into hating South Korea, which was called a "puppet state" of the United States by the PRC government of the time.

From 1992 onward, after South Korea's normalization of relations with China, the relationship between the two nations gradually improved. From 2000 onward, Korean popular culture became popular within China.

A February 2021 survey conducted by scholars from Rice University, the University of British Columbia, and the Lee Kuan Yew School of Public Policy had 43% of Chinese respondents expressing an unfavourable view of South Korea, compared to 49% expressing a favourable view.

Taiwan
Within Taiwan, some existing animosity towards Koreans amongst Taiwanese may be present as a result of the rivalry between the two states in relation to baseball. Disputes between Taiwan and Korea in the international sport competition arose numerous times.

In November 2010, Taiwanese citizens protested against the disqualification of Taekwondo athlete Yang Shu-chun at the 2010 Asian Games after a Korean-Filipino referee disqualified a Taiwanese fighter. Images and messages deriding South Korean products and culture were widely shared online. There were reports of restaurants displaying ‘No Koreans’ signs on their doors, and protesters burning the Korean flag or destroying South Korean products.

On 23 August 1992, South Korea's "Nordpolitik" (Northern diplomacy) have made it to establish a diplomatic ties with the People's Republic of China after Soviet Union. This resulted in the change in the diplomatic relationship of South Korea with the Republic of China, since it replaced anti-communist foreign policy with an effort to improve relations with other surrounding countries in the sense of geopolitics, including the People's Republic of China, in order to pressure and appease North Korea that eases the political anxiety and softens military tension in the Korean Peninsula and enables the possibility of a peaceful reunification of Korea. As normalization begun, President Roh transferred diplomatic recognition from the ROC to PRC, and confiscated the property of the ROC embassy, transferring it to the PRC.

According to an official from the Korean trade office in Taipei, sales of Korean products are not very successful in Taiwan because "the Taiwanese felt very betrayed after Korea severed diplomatic ties with Taiwan and reestablished ties with China in 1992, because the people of Taiwan had seen Korea as an ally in the fight against Communism... Now because the two countries have similar export-oriented economies and focus on the same business sectors, the Taiwanese see Korea as a great rival, and think that losing to Korea would be the end of Taiwan."

In June 2012, CEO of Foxconn Terry Gou stated that he had "great esteem for Japanese (businessmen), especially those who are able to disagree with you in person and not stab you in the back, unlike the Gaoli bangzi (a racial slur for Koreans)", sparking controversy.

Japan

Historically, relations between Japan and Korea have been poor. And much of the modern anti-Korean sentiment can largely stem towards the far-right groups.

Within Korea
Since the end of World War II, the relationship between both North Korea and South Korea have been hostile. The two nations fought against each other in the Korean War, which ended with an armistice agreement in 1953 without a peace treaty. Due to differing political systems and views, both nations claim the entire Korean Peninsula and have competed for sovereignty. In South Korea, hostility toward North Korea is called "anti-North [sentiment]" (반북).

The late 1960s is when tensions between the two states were at its highest point. In 1968, North Korean forces attempted to assassinate the South Korean president, Park Chung-hee. Although the assassination attempt failed, the South Korean government responded by sending in a black operations unit to assassinate the North Korean general secretary, Kim Il-Sung. Further issues have followed during the Uljin–Samcheok Landings, when North Korea established guerrilla camps in the Taebaek Mountains to subdue Park Chung-hee's regime and bring about the reunification of Korea. Although the plan failed, Anti-North Korean attitudes have risen in South Korea, when North Korean commandos allegedly executed Lee Seung-bok, a 9- or 10-year-old South Korean boy, when Lee responded "I hate communists".

Constant naval skirmishes frequently occur between the two states, with North Korea targeting South Korean naval bases. The Bombardment of Yeonpyeong was cited by former UN ambassador Bill Richardson to be "the most serious crisis on the Korean peninsula since the 1953 armistice".

Within North Korea, negative views of South Korea have persisted ever since President Lee Myung-bak  abandoned the Sunshine Policy. North Korea has also been known to violently oppose South Korea's support for the United States military presence in the peninsula.

Within South Korea, negative views result from North Korea's nuclear tests and occasional defectors entering the country. According to a 2014 BBC World Service poll, 3% of South Koreans viewed North Korea's influence positively, with 91% expressing a negative view, making South Korea, after Japan, the country with the most negative feelings of North Korea in the world.

Mongolia
Some South Korean men take sex tourism trips to Mongolia, often as clients of South Korean-run businesses in Mongolia, which has also sparked anti-Korean sentiment among Mongolians, and is said to be responsible for the increasing number of assaults on South Korean nationals in the country.

Philippines
In the recent years, there has been an increasing number of Koreans migrating to the Philippines. An issue is that Koreans are perceived by many locals as rude and refusing to integrate into Philippine society. Another concern is how South Korean tour operators prohibit South Korean tourists from doing business with local tourist firms, which means that the latter barely if at all benefit from the increase in tourists coming from the country. Ethnographic fieldwork done in Sabang from 2003 to 2015 found that the influx of Koreans was viewed negatively by some locals and resident Westerners. South Koreans were also identified in 2007 as the top violator of immigration laws according to the Philippine Bureau of Immigration.

The participation of conscripted Korean soldiers serving under the Japanese Empire's flag in the Japanese occupation of the Philippines in the World War II has caused some Filipinos, especially those from the older generations, to associate the Koreans with atrocities committed during the war.

Foreigners, generally, in the Philippines have been scrutinized for the use of a marketing strategy dubbed as pinoy baiting. The strategy refers to the insincere usage, appropriation, and acknowledgment of Filipino culture by foreigners to pander to a Filipino audience. Many Korean social media influencers have been accused of pinoy-baiting. 

Racist, poor, and biased Korean media portrayal of Filipinos in movies such as Wandeuki (Punch), and negative treatment of Filipino-born or Filipino-raised celebrities living in South Korea, such as politician Jasmine Lee and entertainer Sandara Park, have worsened Filipino views of Koreans. In an interview, Sandara Park stated, "[Filipinos] are really gentle. I feel upset because the Korean media only reports crime [when talking about the Philippines]."

Senator Jinggoy Estrada made a statement about thinking of a proposal to ban all Korean dramas and movies in the Philippines: "My observation is if we continue showing Korean telenovelas, our citizens praise the Koreans while Filipino artists continue losing jobs and money. So sometimes it comes to my mind that we should ban the telenovelas of the foreigners, and the Filipino artists who have great talent in acting are what we should be showing in our own country." Moreover, pro-Marcos blogger Mark Lopez on Twitter said that "Korean dramas are strong because Pinoy telenovelas are weak." Estrada clarified that he was only frustrated "that while we are only too eager and willing to celebrate South Korea's entertainment industry, we have sadly allowed our own to deteriorate because of the lack of support from the movie going public."

#CancelKorea

In September 2020, Filipino TikTok star Bella Poarch posted a video of herself dancing, in which Japan's rising sun flag could be seen tattooed on her arm. Koreans swarmed the comments section saying the tattoo was offensive and that she should apologize and get it removed.

Shortly after backlash and criticism from her video, Bella posted a comment of apology on TikTok : "I’m very sorry if my tattoo offends you," she wrote. "I love Korea, please forgive me." Additionally, her caption read, "I would never do anything to hurt anyone." Bella also explained that she got the tattoo back in March 2020 but had it scheduled for removal. She also promised to learn more about the symbol's history and help educate people further on the symbol, but has been unable to remove the tattoo as a result of the COVID-19 pandemic.

Despite the apology, many Korean users continued with hostile comments, attacking Filipinos referring to them as poor, slaves, ugly, and uneducated, as well as making racist remarks. The issue soon spilled over Twitter, sparking an argument on Korea's racist attitudes and the long history between South Korea and the Philippines. Along with #CancelKorea, the hashtags #ApologizeToFilipinos including #CancelRacism and #한국취소 (meaning Cancel Korea, or in Hanja: #韓國取消) also trended with Twitter, with Filipino users airing out their anger at the mockery and insults.

However, the anger was relieved when other Korean netizens apologized on behalf of the racist remarks, spreading the hashtag '미안해요 필리핀 (#SorryToFillipinos)'. From these apologies, some Filipinos suggested to change the hashtag #CancelKorea to #CancelRacism. Some Filipino netizens went out to apologize for any offensive remarks made against the Koreans during the spat, using the hashtag #SorryToKoreans and accepting the apology.

Indonesia 
In Indonesia, Anti-Korean sentiment emerged in the 2000s. The emergence of anti-Korean sentiment is caused by several factors, such as plastic surgery and atheism in South Korea. Some Indonesians call Koreans "plastic". This stereotype arises because of the popularity of plastic surgery in South Korea. This stereotype has strengthened since the suicide of the former member of Shinee, Jonghyun. In addition, there are assumptions that Korean drama lovers are excessive and people of Korea are always committing adultery. It was reported in 2013 that some Bali businesses had put up signs prohibiting Korean customers, due to reports that a number of them flouted regulations during their stay.

In 2021, a South Korean man allegedly launched racist attack against Indonesian woman on social media, this sparked anger among Indonesian public and triggered further anti-Korean sentiment in the country. also in that year, A Korean internet personality living in the country named SunnyDahye also under fire by Indonesian people due to her past comments calling Indonesians are "stupid" and she also allegedly pretended to fast during the month of Ramadhan,  the live coverage of the 2020 Olympics in garnered ire to some Indonesians after MBC mistakenly setting a picture of the map of Malaysia when the Indonesian contingent arrives at the opening ceremony.

Thailand 
The popularity of the Korean wave in Thailand has led some Thai authorities to cast it as a threat to local culture. Some locals in 2017 reportedly began to perceive Hallyu negatively or as a form of cultural imperialism.

Former Soviet Union

During the era of the Soviet Union, ethnic Koreans in the Russian Far East were subject to deportations under the national delimitation policy, with the majority of Koreans relocating to Soviet republics in Central Asia.

The deportation was preceded by a typical Soviet scenario of political repression: falsified trials of local party leaders accused of insurrection, accusations of plans of the secession of the Far Eastern Krai, local party purges, and articles in Pravda about the Japanese espionage in the Far East.

The resettlement plans were revived with new vigor in August 1937, ostensibly with the purpose of suppressing "the penetration of the Japanese espionage into the Far Eastern Krai". This time, however, the direction of resettlement was westward, to Soviet Central Asia. From September to October 1937, more than 172,000 Soviet Koreans were deported from the border regions of the Russian Far East to Kazakh SSR and Uzbek SSR (the latter including Karakalpak ASSR).

United States
During the Korean War, the United States fought in alliance with South Korea against North Korea. Since the war, United States' citizens have viewed North Korea in an unfavourable light.

Following North Korea's heavy re-militarization and a series of missile tests, Americans were conditioned to fear a possible attack by a "rogue state" such as North Korea. In United States President George W. Bush's State of the Union Address on January 29, 2002, he described North Korea as a part of the "Axis of evil". Following the development of the nuclear program of North Korea and the 2006 North Korean nuclear test, the United States imposed UN sanctions on North Korea. These economic sanctions are very unlikely to be lifted by the United States due to North Korea's noncompliance with the six-party talk agreements.

From 1988 until 2008, and since November 2017, North Korea has been designated a state sponsor of terrorism for supporting Hamas and Hezbollah against Israel, their role in the murder of Kim Jong-nam, supporting dictator Bashar al-Assad in the Syrian Civil War, close relationships with Iran, and the suspicious death of Otto Warmbier.

The Los Angeles riots of 1992 were partially motivated by Anti-Korean sentiment among African-Americans. Ice Cube's song "Black Korea" which would later be accused of inciting racism was written in response to the death of 15-year-old African-American Latasha Harlins, who was shot and killed by Korean-American store owner Soon Ja Du on March 16, 1991, as well as the preponderance of Korean grocery stores in primarily black neighborhoods. The event resulted in the mass ransacking and destruction of Korean-American owned stores in Los Angeles by groups of young African-Americans.

Italy 
In early 2020, a leading Italian music school banned all East Asian students from attending classes due to coronavirus fear, with South Koreans the largest nationality being affected. South Korean students also describe being barred from the building and being mocked by other students because of their origin. In addition, some South Korean residents have reported fear of leaving their homes amid rising incidents of discrimination and mockery, and others considered leaving Italy because they could not "stay in a place that hates us".

Israel 
Because of the COVID-19 pandemic, South Korean tourists were instructed to avoid public places and remain in isolation in their hotels. The Israeli military announced its intention to quarantine South Korean nationals to a military base. Many of the remaining South Koreans were rejected by hotels and were forced to spend nights at Ben Gurion Airport. An Israeli newspaper subsequently published a Korean complaint that "Israel is Treating [Korean and other Asian] Tourists Like Coronavirus". South Korean Foreign Minister Kang Kyung-wha has described Israel's response as "excessive".

Germany 
Many Koreans residents in Germany have reported an increase in anti-Korean incidents following the outbreak of COVID-19, and the South Korean embassy has warned its citizens of the increasing hateful climate facing them. As suspicion toward Koreans is growing, locals are also opting to avoid Korean restaurants, some of which have reported a sales decline of 80%.

Netherlands 
KLM, the country's flag carrier airline, prohibited only Korean passengers from using their toilets on one of their flights.

In general, there has recently been a spate of anti-Korean incidents in the Netherlands, which have targeted both Korean nationals and Dutch people of Korean descent. These incidents range from vandalism of homes to violent assault to harassment. More than 150 Korean expat respondents in an online survey indicated they had experienced an xenophobic incident.

Brazil
Despite the popularity of South Korean culture in Brazil among young people, as part of the Korean Wave, a certain anti-Korean feeling persisted and some anti-Korean incidents occurred in Brazil. In 2017, the Brazilian television host Raul Gil was accused of racism and xenophobia when making derogatory jokes to Asians and a "slit eye" gesture during a live interview with the K-Pop group K.A.R.D, generating repercussions in the Brazilian press and abroad. In 2019, a Brazilian couple published several videos on social media making fun of Korean food and language during a trip to South Korea. The case generated harsh criticism on social media.

Vietnam
Although South Korea and Vietnam have developed diplomatic relations since 1992, it has been alleged in Vietnam that South Korean troops engaged in war crimes during the Vietnam War, killing somewhere between 40,000 to 50,000 civilians, a charge long denied by South Korea. However in 2020, Vietnamese citizen Nguyen Thi Thanh filed a lawsuit against South Korea, claiming to be a survivor of the alleged atrocities, being the survivor of his dead family. Other alleged survivors also began to file lawsuits against South Korea. The Vietnam War was also a time of solidarity between Vietnam and North Korea. Anti-South Korean sentiment still exists amongst older generation Vietnamese because of these war crimes. South Korea provided more troops in the Vietnam War after the United States. 

Allegations of sex trafficking in South Korea of Vietnamese women also leaves a negative sentiment amongst Vietnamese people.

Derogatory terms 
There are a variety of derogatory terms referring to Korea. Many of these terms are viewed as racist. However, these terms do not necessarily refer to the Korean people as a whole; they can also refer to specific policies, or specific time periods in history.

In Filipino (Tagalog)
 Retoke Koreano – literally "plastic Korean" referring to South Korea's high rates of plastic surgery.

In English
 Gook – a derogatory term used by occupying US military to refer to native people, mainly Asians. The etymology of this racial slur is shrouded in mystery, disagreement, and controversy. The Oxford English Dictionary admits that its origin is "unknown" but traces its usage through US military deployments in the Philippines, Korea, and Vietnam, while other sources record it during the occupation of Haiti. A widespread urban legend holds that it derives from the Korean term 미국/美國, miguk, meaning "America", which American soldiers interpreted as "me gook", or from other variants involving the word for country, guk.
 Kimchi – derogatory term for Koreans derived from the Korean dish of the same name.

In Chinese
 Gaoli bangzi (Simplified Chinese: 高丽棒子; Traditional Chinese:高麗棒子; pinyin: gāolì bàngzǐ) – derogatory term used against all ethnic Koreans. Gaoli refers to ancient Korea (Goryeo), while bangzi means "club" or "corncob", referring to how traditional Korean clothing supposedly had trousers that resembled a corn fitting into its cob. There are other various etymologies; some suggest that the term originates from Taiwan as a result of its baseball rivalry with South Korea, where 棒子 refers to a baseball bat; another explanation refers to the Second Sino-Japanese War, where ethnic Koreans in the Imperial Japanese Army were unarmed, and hence beat civilians with sticks and clubs in occupied areas. Sometimes 韓棒子 (hán bàng zǐ, "韓" referring to South Korea) and 死棒子 (sǐ bàng zǐ, literally "dead corncob") are also used.
 Gaoli paocai (Traditional Chinese: 高麗泡菜; pinyin: gāolì pàocài) – literally "Goryeo kimchi" or "Korean kimchi", which makes a reference to kimchi, a Korean staple food. Used by Taiwanese baseball fans, as a result of their rivalry against South Korea, where Taiwan is commonly defeated by the South Korean national team. Variants include 死泡菜 ("dead kimchi").
 Er guizi (Simplified Chinese: 二鬼子; pinyin: èr guǐzi) – a disparaging designation of puppet armies and traitors during the Chinese War of Resistance against Japanese Aggression. As with the term hanjian, the definition of 二鬼子 has varied throughout history. Japanese were known as "鬼子" (devils), and 二鬼子 literally translates into "second devils". During World War II, some Koreans served in the Imperial Japanese Army, so 二鬼子 refers to hanjian (i.e. Chinese who collaborated with the Japanese) and ethnic Koreans. During the Chinese Civil War, both the Chinese Communist Party and Kuomintang accused each other of being hanjian, and the term 二鬼子 was then applied to the Kuomintang by the communists. More recently, 二鬼子 mainly refers to South Koreans. In addition to the historical background of World War II era, Koreans are perceived as resembling Japanese in their appearance and popular culture.

In Japanese
 Chon  – vernacular nickname for Koreans, with strongly offensive overtones.
  – literally "kimchi bastard". In 2003, Mongolian sumo wrestler Asashōryū was taking interviews from journalists when he called a Korean journalist a "kimchi yarō", sparking controversy. The phrase became a sensation on the 2channel messageboard overnight following the incident.
  – derived from the non-derogatory term  used to describe Koreans in a neutral manner. The term, however, has eventually been used in a derogatory manner against Korean people.
  – meaning "Tokutei (East) Asian". A derogatory term used against Koreans and Chinese.

In Korean
  – literally "Commies", "Reds" or "Communist supporter" – a South Korean term used to insult North Korea or anyone who shows appreciation to North Korea. This term has become more commonplace, especially towards former South Korean president Moon Jae-in, who is known for his pro-North Korean policies.

In Thai
 Gao Lao (เกาเหลา) – A national dish of Thailand, corrupted from Gao Li (เกาหลี), exonym name of korea. Humorous and derogatory term.
 Gao Hee (เกาหี) – literally means “to scratch vagina”, also corrupted from Gaoli. Humorous and derogatory term.
 Hwang Mi Hee (ฮวังมีฮี) – Common name in Korea, literally means “Hwang have vagina”. Humorous and derogatory term.

See also
 Anti-Chinese sentiment in Korea
 Anti-American sentiment in Korea
 Media coverage of North Korea
 Anti-Japanese sentiment in Korea
 Netto-uyoku
 Korean conflict
 Zaitokukai
 Lai Đại Hàn

References

 
Discrimination in China
Discrimination in Japan
Korea